Bill L. Van Gerpen (born March 16, 1949 in Scotland, South Dakota) is an American politician and a Republican member of the South Dakota Senate representing District 19 since January 8, 2013. Van Gerpen served several non-consecutive periods in the South Dakota Legislature from January 1997 until January 1999 from January 2001 until January 2007, and from January 2009 until January 2011 in the South Dakota House of Representatives District 19 seat.

Education
Van Gerpen earned his BSE in social science from Southern State College (later the University of South Dakota–Springfield) and his Master of Divinity from Southwestern Baptist Theological Seminary.

Elections
 2012 When incumbent Senate District 22 Republican Senator Jim Putnam ran for House District 19 and left the District 19 seat open, Van Gerpen was unopposed for the June 5, 2012 Republican Primary and won the November 6, 2012 General election with 7,024 votes (60%) against Democratic Representative and former Senator Frank Kloucek.
 1996 When House District 19 incumbent Republican Representative Edward Van Gerpen ran for South Dakota Senate, Bill Van Gerpen and incumbent Representative Putnam were unopposed for the 1996 Republican Primary, in the four-way November 5, 1996 General election, Van Gerpen took the first seat with 5,236 votes (30.66%) and fellow Republican nominee Jim Putnam took the second seat ahead of Democratic nominees Susan Paul and LaVern Aisenbrey.
 1998 To challenge incumbent Democratic Senator Frank Kloucek, Van Gerpen was unopposed for the 1998 Republican Primary but lost the November 3, 1998 General election to Senator Kloucek.
 2000 When incumbent Representative Putnam ran for South Dakota Senate, Van Gerpen ran in the four-way June 6, 2000 Republican Primary and placed first with 1,607 votes (43.5%); in the four-way November 7, 2000 General election Democratic Senator Frank Kloucek took the first seat and Van Gerpen took the second seat with 5,374 votes (34.1%) ahead of fellow Republican Representative Richard Wudel and Democratic nominee Wahnel Ulmer.
 2002 With incumbent Representative Frank Kloucek running for South Dakota Senate and leaving a House District 19 seat open, Van Gerpen and Jim Putnam were unopposed for the June 4, 2002 Republican Primary; in the three-way November 5, 2002 General election Van Gerpen took the first seat with 5,964 votes (41.1%) and Representative Putnam took the second seat ahead of Democratic nominee Leroy Zeeb, who had run for the Senate in 2000.
 2004 Van Gerpen and Representative Putnam were unopposed for both the June 1, 2004 Republican Primary and the November 2, 2004 General election where Van Gerpen took the first seat with 6,769 votes (54.2%) and Representative Putnam took the second seat after two Democratic candidates withdrew.
 2008 Van Gerpen and Representative Putnam were unopposed for the June 3, 2008 Republican Primary when Representative Jerke withdrew; and won the five-way November 4, 2008 General election where Van Gerpen took the first seat with 5,661 votes (35.4%) and Representative Putnam took the second seat ahead of Democratic nominees Glennis Stern, Travis Lape, and Independent candidate Richard Hall.

References

External links
 Official page at the South Dakota Legislature
 

1949 births
Living people
United States Air Force chaplains
Baptists from South Dakota
Republican Party members of the South Dakota House of Representatives
People from Tyndall, South Dakota
Republican Party South Dakota state senators
Southwestern Baptist Theological Seminary alumni
21st-century American politicians